White Houses may refer to:

White Houses, Nottinghamshire, England
"White Houses" (Eric Burdon and The Animals song), recorded by Eric Burdon and the Animals
"White Houses" (Vanessa Carlton song), by Vanessa Carlton

See also
White House (disambiguation)
Whitehouse (disambiguation)